The swimming events at the 2014 South American Games were held from March 7–10 at the new Aquatic Center of the Estadio Nacional (trans: "National Stadium") in Santiago.

Event schedule

Open Water schedule
Sunday, March 16: 10-kilometer man/woman races (10K) 
Monday, March 17: 3-kilometer mixed race (3K)

Pool finals schedule

Results

Men's events

Legend:

Women's events

Legend:

Team

Swimming medal standings

Open water medal standings

References

 
2014 South American Games events
South American Games
2014